PARCO Coastal Refinery Limited is a proposed Pakistani oil refinery in Khalifa Point in Lasbela District, Balochistan, Pakistan. It is established by the Pak-Arab Refinery (PARCO) which is a joint-venture between governments of Pakistan and Abu Dhabi.

The refinery site is to be located west of Hub, Balochistan, near Gaddani coastal area. The project is expected to cost US$6 billion.

In addition to the refinery, the project includes also 250 MW natural gas-fired power plant, a grid station, a seaport jetty and a city to accommodate refinery workers.

The project was approved by Government of Pakistan in October 2007.  

As of August 2013, Abu Dhabi plans to revive Khalifa refinery project after Debt has been cleared.

References

Oil refineries in Pakistan
Lasbela District
Energy in Balochistan, Pakistan
Pakistan–United Arab Emirates relations